Kia Toa RFC is a constituent club in the Manawatu province for rugby in New Zealand. It is at the Palmerston North Bowling Club on Linton Street and is one of the oldest clubs in the Manawatu.

Kia Toa is a Māori term, which can be translated as "Be Brave".

Due to the colours of the jersey, a dark blue and light blue combination, Kia Toa are known sometimes as "The Double Blues."

History
The club was founded in 1902 and is the oldest Town based club in the Manawatu. The club is currently based out of the Manawatu Bowling Club at 24 Linton Street. Eight of its senior players have worn the All Blacks jersey, six women players have worn the Black Ferns jersey. Additionally, there have been members who have worn the New Zealand colours in Sevens, Maori All Blacks, New Zealand U-20s, and New Zealand Divisional XV, and hundreds who have worn the green and white representative colours.

Honors
2017 Runners Up
2016 Runners Up
2015 Runners Up
2014 Runners Up
2013 Hankins Shield Winner
2010 Hankins Shield Winner
2009 Hankins Shield Winner

Notable people from Kia Toa
Men
 Sione Asi, Manawatu Turbo
 Brayden Iose, Hurricane, Manawatu Turbo, New Zealand Secondary Schools Captain
 Jackson Hemopo, Maori All Black, Highlanders, Manawatu Turbos
 Ngani Laumape, All Black no. 1160, Hurricane, Manawatu Turbo, New Zealand Warriors 2013-2015
 Valentino Mapapalangi, Tonga, Leicester Tigers, Manawatu Turbos
 Nathan Tudreu, Manawatu Turbo
 Newton Tudreu, Manawatu Turbo
 Jade Te Rure, Manawatu Turbo, New Zealand under 20s
 Jason Emery, Maori All Blacks, Sunwolves, Highlanders, Manawatu Turbo, New Zealand Under 20s, New Zealand Secondary Schools.
 Dan Squires, Manawatu Turbo
 George Tilsly, All Black Sevens
 Tevita Taufu'i, Tonga, Waikato, Manawatu Turbos 
 Bryn Templemen, Manawatu Turbos
 Lote Raikabula, New Zealand Sevens, Manawatu Turbos
 Ma'afu Fia, Ospreys, Highlanders, Manawatu Turbo
 Scott Curry, Manawatu Turbo, All Black Sevens Captain
 Fraser Stone, Manawatu Turbo
 Kurt Baker, All Blacks Sevens
 Dan Ward-Smith, London Wasps
 Bertus Mulder, Durban Sharks, Manawatu Turbos 
 Siaosi Anamani, Manawatu Turbos
 Christian Cullen, All Black no. 952
 Lifeimi Mafi, Munster Rugby
 Siaosi Anamani, Manawatu Turbo
 Daniel Alofa, Manawatu Turbo
 Roelof 'Joggie' Viljeon, Springbok, Cape Town Stormers, Pretoria Bulls, Hurricanes, Manawatu Turbo
 Stuart Ross, Manawatu Rugby Legend
 Tony Mafi, Manawatu Rugby Legend

Women
 Farah Palmer, New Zealand Black Ferns captain, IRB Hall Of Fame, First Woman on the Board of New Zealand Rugby, International Women's Personality of the Year 
 Selica Winiata, New Zealand Black Ferns, New Zealand Womans Sevens, New Zealand Rugby women's player of the year 2016
 Rebekah Cordero Tufuga, New Zealand Womans Sevens
 Crystal Mayes, New Zealand Womans Sevens
 Mahlia Polson, Manawatu Cyclones
 Carys Dallinger, Manawatu Cyclones
 Caterina Poletti, Manawatu Cyclones
 Janna Michal Vaughan, Manawatu Cyclones
 Jayme Nuku, Manawatu Cyclones
 Marilyn Live, Manawatu Cyclones
 Taylor Waterson, Manawatu Cyclones
 Paige Lush, Manawatu Cyclones

Foreigners
 Tudor Constantin, former Romanian national, who played in France for Tarbes, RC Paris and Bordeaux Bègles.

References

External links
 

Sport in Palmerston North
New Zealand rugby union teams